Gilbert High School is a public high school in Gilbert, Iowa, United States. A part of the Gilbert Community School District, it serves Gilbert and northern Ames.

Infrastructure
The current high school was opened in 2012. In the high school there is a gymnasium and modern weight lifting facility. Outside there is a softball and baseball diamond, along with a new AstroTurf football field. The school boasts a strong agricultural and mechanics education program.

Athletics
Gilbert's mascot is the Tiger. Gilbert High School is a member of the Raccoon River Conference. Teams sponsored by the school in fall include football, cross-country, and volleyball. During winter, the school sponsors basketball, wrestling, and bowling. There are also hockey and swim teams in Ames that many Gilbert students compete on, but they are not school-affiliated. The spring sports lineup consists of golf, track, and soccer. Lastly, the school features baseball and softball in the summer.

Gilbert's biggest rivals are the nearby Boone Toreadors, Roland-Story Norsemen, Nevada Cubs and Ballard Bombers.

Successes
Gilbert's boys cross country team were the Class 3A State Champions in 2014, 2017, 2018.

Gilbert's boys golf team was the Class 2A state runner-up in 2008, and were state champions in 2021.

Notable alumni
Jerry McNertney — former Major League Baseball player

See also
List of high schools in Iowa

References

Schools in Story County, Iowa
Public high schools in Iowa
2012 establishments in Iowa